The Movement for the Independence of Sicily (MIS) was a separatist Sicilian political party originally active in Sicily from 1943 to 1951. Its best electoral result was in 1947, when it won 8.8% of the votes in the Sicilian regional election and had nine regional deputies elected.

The party was supported by Sicilians from a very wide of political stances: both conservatives and socialists were involved at some point. The purpose was first to gain independence for Sicily. Once this was accomplished MIS planned to sort out the politics of the island themselves, with the movement splintering to found new Sicilian political parties with their own personal stances.

History
The movement was founded in September 1942 as Committee for the Independence of Sicily (Comitato per l'Indipendenza della Sicilia, CIS) finding inspiration in the Sicilian Vespers, with Andrea Finocchiaro Aprile serving as its first president. The movement included members of very different political views, such as revolutionary socialist Antonio Canepa, social-democrat Giovanni Guarino Amella, right-wing people, most of them aristocrats, such as baron Lucio Tasca and duke Guglielmo Paternò, and members with close ties to the Mafia, as well as outright Mafiosi such as Calogero Vizzini.
The movement gained presence and support following the Armistice of Cassibile of September 8, 1943, which forced Italy to abandon the island, while the U.S. troops still were on the verge of completing the military occupation of Sicily. In October 1943, Finocchiaro Aprile asked the King of Italy Victor Emmanuel III to abdicate, and successively gained support to his cause from about ten Sicilian deputies. In the spring of 1944, the CIS was disbanded and the Movement for the Independence of Sicily (MIS) was founded. During those days, the Allies prohibited any kind of political activity, but tolerated the existence of the MIS. Several politicians with strong ties with the Mafia, such as Calogero Vizzini and Calogero Volpe, joined the MIS; however, all of them soon later left the MIS in order to join the newborn Italian parties, such as the Christian Democracy.

In the fall of 1944, during the first congress held in Taormina, the MIS decided to arm itself under pushes from its more radical members. The EVIS (Esercito Volontario per l'Indipendenza della Sicilia, Volunteer Army for the Independence of Sicily) was founded, and its operations led the Italian central government to send its troops in Sicily. On June 17, 1945, following an armed clash with the Carabinieri, Antonio Canepa, head of the EVIS, was murdered.

After the end of World War II, a special council started working on a special autonomy statute for Sicily, which was approved by King Umberto II of Italy on May 15, 1946, and was finally approved by the Italian parliament on February 26, 1948. The bandit Salvatore Giuliano joined it.

In the 1946 general election, MIS obtained 0.7% of national votes (8.8% of votes in Sicily), and four seats, including its leader Finocchiaro Aprile. During the 1947 congress, Antonino Varvaro, former secretary and leading member of the left wing, was expelled from the party by a majority. The reasons remained unknown. Following these events, Varvaro founded a rival independentist movement, MISDR, which did not achieve much success and disbanded soon. In the first Sicilian elections held in 1947, MIS obtained about 9% of votes, and eight seats. However, the movement lost all its seats following the 1948 general election and the 1951 regional election. Soon after the latter, Finocchiaro Aprile and several other members resigned from MIS and the movement entered into a sort of political hiatus, never being formally disbanded.

Sicilian Independence Movement today 
The Sicilian independence movement continued to live thanks to Rosario Fasanaro, historical independence pioneer of the movement in Catania, then Regional Secretary until January 27, 2004, the year of his death. 

On April 22, 2004 an association was formed called movimento per l'Indipendenza della Sicilia, which refers directly to the experience of the MIS of the 1940s. On 11 May 2009,during a press conference, the leaders of the Movement gave the honorary member card to the then President of the Sicilian Region Raffaele Lombardo the following motivation: "For having placed himself at the service of the "autonomist cause" and for helping to awaken the identity and pride of the Sicilian People", fearing the hypothesis of an alliance with the Movement for Autonomies, of which Lombardo himself is the leader. Alliance that has not been followed.

In November 2016, a new name was created, Movimento Nazionale Siciliano, between three Sicilian groups: Movimento per l'Indipendenza della Sicilia, Fronte Nazionale Siciliano, and Sicilia Nazione in these elections, but which did not present its own lists in the regional elections of November 2017.

The independentist Massimo Cirano, belonging to the "Archimedes Section" of the MIS presented himself in April 2019, with his symbol and list, to the administrative authorities of the municipality of Bagheria obtaining 1160 votes

Symbols 

 The Sicilian Independence Movement had the Trinacria as its symbol.
 The movement used the so-called Three-finger salute, that represents the Trinacria's three legs.
 Colors red and yellow

Electoral results

Italian Constitutional Assembly

Sicilian Regional Assembly

Citations

General and cited sources 
 
 
 
 
 
 
 
 Norman Lewis (2003). The Honoured Society: The Sicilian Mafia Observed. Eland Publishing Ltd. .

20th century in Sicily
Political parties in Sicily
Political parties disestablished in 1951
Political parties established in 1943
Sicilian nationalist parties
Sicilian rebellions